Dostler is a German surname. Notable people with the surname include:

 Anton Dostler (1891–1945), German general executed for war crimes
 Eduard Ritter von Dostler (1892–1917), German fighter ace

See also
 Doster

German-language surnames